Area codes 303, 720 and 983 are telephone area codes in the North American Numbering Plan for the north-central portion of the U.S. state of Colorado. The numbering plan area comprises Denver and Boulder, as well as their surrounding suburbs, including Lakewood, Littleton, Longmont, Broomfield,  Aurora, and Castle Rock. Area code 303 is the original area code, while area codes 720 and 983 were added (1998, 2022 respectively) to form an overlay plan for the area, meaning that the same geographic service area is served by all area codes and that ten-digit dialing is required for all calls made within the service area.

History
Area code 303 was one of the original North American area codes of 1947, and originally served the entire state of Colorado. It remained the state's sole area code for 40 years. 

Colorado's explosive growth in the second half of the 20th century, particularly in the Denver/Boulder area, made it a certainty that Colorado would need another area code. An impending number shortage in the late 1980s meant this split could no longer be staved off. On March 5, 1988, southeastern Colorado, including Colorado Springs and Pueblo, was divided from the statewide area and received area code 719. Further demand for numbers led to another split: The northeastern and western portions of area code 303, including Fort Collins, Grand Junction, Vail and Aspen, were separated on April 2, 1995, and became area code 970.  This split reduced 303 to the Denver-Boulder area. With the 1995 split, 303 was the only Colorado area code that did not border another state.

Although the 1995 split was intended as a long-term solution, the area continued to experience sharp growth so that within two years, further relief was necessary. The Front Range area is home not only to most of Colorado's landlines, but also most of the state's cell phones, fax machines, and pagers. On September 1, 1998, area code 720 was instituted in the 303 service area to create an overlay. 

In 2020, the North American Numbering Plan Administrator estimated that the Denver metropolitan area would reach numbering exhaustion by 2023. Accordingly, the Colorado Public Utilities Commission approved on May 21, 2021 an additional area code for the all-services distributed overlay of NPA 303/720. In early 2022, Area code 983 is in the network preparation stage, with first office code assignments scheduled not before June 17, 2022. In addition, no central office code in 983 may be installed before complete exhaustion of the existing area codes.

The addition results in 23.8 million numbers being assigned to an area of about 3.5 million people.

Local calling
The numbering plan area is one of the largest toll-free calling zones in the western United States. With the exception of Roggen, Brighton, and Wiggins, no long-distance charges are levied for any calls made from one telephone to another in the area.

With the exception of Roggen, ten-digit dialing is mandatory in the area.

See also
List of Colorado area codes

References

External links
Localcallingguide.com NPA 303
Localcallingguide.com NPA 720

Telecommunications-related introductions in 1947
Telecommunications-related introductions in 1998
303
303
Boulder, Colorado
Denver metropolitan area